KURM (790 AM) is a radio station broadcasting both News Talk Information and Brokered programming formats. Licensed to Rogers, Arkansas, United States, it serves the Fayetteville (North West Arkansas) area.  The station is currently owned by KERM, Inc.  790 AM is a Regional broadcast frequency.

Station owner Kermit Womack is the father of Arkansas Congressman Steve Womack.

External links
KURM's official website

News and talk radio stations in the United States
Brokered programming
URM
Radio stations established in 1983